Héctor Cruz may refer to:

 Héctor Cruz (actor), in telenovelas such as Clase 406
 Héctor Cruz (baseball) (born 1953), former outfielder/third baseman in Major League Baseball
 Héctor Cruz (footballer) (born 1991), Peruvian soccer player who plays for Los Caimanes

es:Héctor Cruz